The Museum of European and Mediterranean Civilisations (Mucem; French: Musée des Civilisations de l'Europe et de la Méditerranée) is a national museum located in Marseille, France. It was inaugurated on 7 June 2013 as part of Marseille-Provence 2013, a year when Marseille was designated as the European Capital of Culture. In 2015, it won the Council of Europe Museum Prize.

Overview
The museum is devoted to European and Mediterranean civilisations. With a permanent collection charting historical and cultural cross-fertilisation in the Mediterranean basin, it takes an interdisciplinary approach to society through the ages up to modern times.

The museum is built on reclaimed land at the entrance to the harbour, next to the site of the 17th-century Fort Saint-Jean and a former port terminal called the J4. A channel separates the new building and the Fort Saint-Jean, which has been restructured as part of the project. Another footbridge links the Fort Saint-Jean to the Esplanade de la Tourette, near the church of St Laurent in the Panier quarter.

The museum, built "of stone, water and wind", was designed by the architect Rudy Ricciotti in collaboration with the architect Roland Carta. A cube of  surrounded by a latticework shell of fibre-reinforced concrete, it houses exhibits on two levels, with an underground auditorium seating 400. The permanent collection and bookshop are situated on the ground floor. There is a restaurant on the terrace at the top of the building with panoramic views of the bay of Marseille, the Corniche and the Prado.

Galerie

See also
Musée national des Arts et Traditions Populaires (France)

References

External links

Museums in Marseille
Tourist attractions in Marseille
2013 establishments in France
Museums established in 2013
Cultural infrastructure completed in 2013
Rudy Ricciotti buildings
National museums of France